Carlyon is a surname. Notable people with the surname include:

Harrison Carlyon (born 2001), Jersey cricketer
Les Carlyon (1942–2019), Australian writer and newspaper editor
Loveday Carlyon, Cornish nationalist politician
Norman Carlyon (born 1938), Australian cricketer
Phillip H. Carlyon (1863–1946), American politician
Richard Carlyon (1930–2006), American artist
Tom Carlyon (1902–1982), Australian rules footballer
Tony Carlyon (born 1970), Jersey cricketer

See also 

Carlon